Carrasquel is a surname. Notable people with the surname include:

Alex Carrasquel (1912–1969), Venezuelan baseball player
Chico Carrasquel (1926–2005), Venezuelan baseball player
Neily Carrasquel (born 1997), Venezuelan footballer